Saunderstown is a small village and historic district in the towns of Narragansett and North Kingstown in Washington County, Rhode Island, United States. Saunderstown has its own post office with the ZIP Code of 02874, which also includes a small part of South Kingstown. Its population is 6,245.

Overview
Saunderstown is known as the birthplace of artist Gilbert Stuart, who is best known for painting the portrait of George Washington that is portrayed on the one-dollar bill. The Gilbert Stuart Birthplace and Museum consists of the house in which Stuart was born, a nature trail, and a functional gristmill, and is now open to the public as a museum. Saunderstown is also the location of Casey Farm, an 18th-century plantation that is now a family farm. The farm grows organic vegetables, herbs, and flowers in a Community Supported Agriculture Program. It is operated by Historic New England.

Saunderstown is largely rural and is home to 6,245 people at a population density of 412 people per square mile. The racial makeup is 96.1% white, 0.4% black, 1.1% Asian, 1.2% Hispanic, and 0.2% other.

Saunderstown has a median household income of $135,514.

Historic district
The Saunderstown Historic District encompasses a section of Saunderstown which developed as a boatbuilding center and summer resort area in the late 19th century. It is centered on Ferry Road, Willett Road, and Waterway, between Boston Neck Road and Narragansett Bay.  In addition to being home to a number of shipyards, several owned by members of the Saunders family, the area also became noted as a summer resort, hosting Benoni Lockwood and Frances Willing Wharton (a cousin to writer Edith Wharton), as well as the architect and artist Christopher Grant LaFarge, son of the famous artist John La Farge.  This area is mainly residential, with wood-frame houses one or two stories in height, with vernacular styling.  Non-residential buildings include a country store, recreation center (which was formerly a fire barn), and the Saunderstown Post Office, which was built in 1902 as a Baptist church.

See also
 National Register of Historic Places listings in Washington County, Rhode Island

References 

Historic districts in Washington County, Rhode Island
Historic districts on the National Register of Historic Places in Rhode Island
Narragansett, Rhode Island
North Kingstown, Rhode Island
Providence metropolitan area
Villages in Rhode Island
Villages in Washington County, Rhode Island